Joint Foreign Affairs and Defense Committee (UFöU) is a parliamentary committee in the Swedish Riksdag, made up of members of both the Foreign Affairs Committee and the Defence Committee.

Issues that are dealt with by a committee composed for the purpose are primarily decisions about Swedish participation in international initiatives. According to the regeringsformen (Government Act), Chapter 15, §16 requires the consent of the Riksdag in order for a Swedish armed force to be sent abroad. Following a proposal from the government, it is thus the Riksdag that ultimately decides on this after consideration of the issue in a composite committee. International security policy cooperation, such as the issue of host country agreements with NATO and Swedish security policy, are other issues that can be handled in a joint committee. The committee will also deal with international crisis management.

The Joint Foreign Affairs and Defense Committee was formed on October 25, 2001. The committee was set up temporarily to deal with issues concerning Swedish and international security policies. The committee dealt with the security policy assessments that were included as part of the Government's bill on Continued renewal of the total defense bill (2001/02: 10) and a number of motions on security policy issues. The security policy orientation for the period 2016–2020 was also discussed by a composite committee in connection with the most recent defense decision. The Government's assessments of the security policy development are discussed in the composite committee, but the Government's proposal on how the Swedish defense should only be designed is discussed in the Defense Committee.

See also 
 Foreign policy

References

External links
Riksdag - Sammansatta utrikes- och försvarsutskottet Riksdag - Joint Foreign Affairs and Defense Committee

Committees of the Riksdag